Qosbeh-ye Maniat (also Romanized as Qoşbeh-ye Manī‘āt; also known as Gusbah, Qaşabeh, Qaşabeh-ye Meyghāt, Qisbeh, and Qoşbeh) is a village in Howmeh-ye Sharqi Rural District, in the Central District of Khorramshahr County, Khuzestan Province, Iran. At the 2006 census, its population was 52, in 13 families.

References 

Populated places in Khorramshahr County